Road to Morocco is a 1942 American comedy film starring Bing Crosby, Bob Hope and Dorothy Lamour, and featuring Anthony Quinn and Dona Drake.  The film, which was written by Frank Butler and Don Hartman and directed by David Butler for Paramount Pictures, is the third of the "Road to …" films. It was preceded by Road to Zanzibar (1941) and followed by Road to Utopia (1946). The story is about two fast-talking guys castaway on a desert shore and sold into slavery to a beautiful princess. The setting is in Morocco.

Plot
The film opens with a sea freighter exploding. While the cause of the explosion remains a mystery, two stowaways, Jeff Peters and Orville 'Turkey' Jackson, are seen floating on wreckage. It is revealed that Orville's smoking habit caused the blast, and the two men joke about cannibalism as they spot land. Upon reaching the beach, Orville reminds Jeff of his promise to Aunt Lucy to take care of him, but Jeff says she died before he could agree to it. Conveniently, a camel appears, and they hitch a ride.

As Jeff and Orville make their way into the city, they are nearly run over by Arabs led by Sheik Mullay Kasim, who has come to propose to Princess Shalmar. Orville is approached by men carrying a mysterious woman in a veiled box, and her hand takes his before they leave. While at a restaurant, Jeff and Orville plan to skip out on the bill, but a man takes Jeff aside and gives him some money. Jeff had sold Orville, and although he is initially angry, he eventually calms down after Jeff promises to buy him back. Two men then throw a hood over Orville and carry him off.

Jeff has a vision of Aunt Lucy, who shames him for selling Orville. He attempts to buy Orville back but discovers that he has been sold once again. Aunt Lucy then advises Jeff to find Orville and suggests that he sing his favorite song. Jeff walks and sings until a note and Orville's locket are thrown from the palace, warning him of danger. Jeff climbs over the palace wall and hears a woman singing. He sneaks in and finds Orville with Princess Shalmar and other beautiful girls.

Jeff storms into the palace but is caught by guards. Orville pretends not to know him, resulting in the princess dismissing everyone except Jeff. Orville then confesses to their engagement, but the princess reveals that she bought him and that her wise man advised her to marry him. The princess invites Jeff to stay, and Orville is waited on by girls, including Mihirmah, who confesses her love for him. Jeff confronts Orville, who then has him thrown out.

Later, Jeff sings and attracts the princess, and they go for a walk. Mihirmah tries to convince Orville to leave with her. Jeff tells the princess that he should be the one marrying her, but Orville threatens him with a sword. The following day, Kasim threatens to kill Orville, but the princess takes him to the wise man, who reveals a prophecy: the first husband will die a violent death within a week of marriage, and the second will have a long and happy life. The princess declares that Orville is the first husband, and Kasim finally understands.

Orville learns of the prophecy and runs off with Mihirmah, convincing Jeff that the princess actually loves him. That night, Aunt Lucy's spirit rebukes Orville. Princess Shalmar refuses to marry Jeff and sends Orville away to prepare for the wedding. Later, the wise man tells the princess and Jeff that he misread the stars and that the prophecy is incorrect. Jeff now understands why Orville wanted to avoid the marriage, and tells him that the princess has changed her mind. Meanwhile, Kasim learns of the news and rallies his men.

Princess Shalmar and Jeff decide to get married in the United States along with Orville and Mihirmah. However, Kasim intervenes and abducts the princess while giving Mihirmah to one of his men. Jeff and Orville attempt to use their 'patty-cake' routine on Kasim, but it fails, and they end up getting captured along with the girls.

Kasim leaves Jeff and Orville stranded in the desert and takes the women with him. While wandering in the desert, they discover an oasis near Kasim's camp. They try to sneak in but are caught. They then witness a clash between two sheiks and take advantage of the chaos to escape with the girls.

Eventually, they board a boat back home. However, things take a dangerous turn when Orville causes an explosion while smoking in the powder room. Fortunately, they all survive by clinging onto a pile of wreckage near New York harbor.

Cast

 Bing Crosby as Jeff Peters
 Bob Hope as Orville "Turkey" Jackson
 Dorothy Lamour as Princess Shalmar
 Anthony Quinn as Mullay Kasim
 Dona Drake as Mihirmah
 Vladimir Sokoloff as Hyder Khan
 Mikhail Rasumny as Ahmed Fey
 George Givot as Neb Jolla
 Leon Belasco as Yusef

 Monte Blue as Second aide to Mullay Kassim
 George Lloyd as First guard
 Dan Seymour as Arabian buyer
 Stanley Price as Idiot
 Louise LaPlanche as handmaiden
 Yvonne De Carlo as handmaiden
 Brandon Hurst as English announcer
 Nestor Paiva as Arab sausage vendor
 Cy Kendall as Fruit stall proprietor (uncredited)

Reception
The film was placed at No. 4 in the list of top-grossing movies for 1942 in the USA.

Bosley Crowther of The New York Times liked it: "Let us be thankful that Paramount is still blessed with Bing Crosby and Bob Hope, and that it has set its cameras to tailing these two irrepressible wags on another fantastic excursion, Road to Morocco, which came to the Paramount yesterday. For the screen, under present circumstances, can hold no more diverting lure than the prospect of Hope and Crosby ambling, as they have done before, through an utterly slaphappy picture, picking up Dorothy Lamour along the way and tossing acid wisecracks at each other without a thought for reason or sense...The short of it is that Road to Morocco is a daffy, laugh-drafting film. And you’ll certainly agree with the camel which, at one point, offers the gratuitous remark, 'This is the screwiest picture I was ever in'."

Variety commented: "Crosby, Hope and Lamour have done it again. Their click in Road to Singapore and Road to Zanzibar is eclipsed by Road to Morocco... Crosby, of course, is still more or less straighting for Hope’s incessantly steaming gags. The two have never teamed better, nor have they, seemingly, romped with such abandon."

Songs
 "(We're Off on the) Road to Morocco", sung by Bing Crosby and Bob Hope
 "Ain't Got a Dime to My Name", sung by Bing Crosby
 "Constantly", sung by Dorothy Lamour
 "Moonlight Becomes You", sung by Bing Crosby, and later by Lamour, Hope, and Crosby

All lyrics to all songs are by Johnny Burke to music by Jimmy Van Heusen.

Bing Crosby recorded several of the songs for Decca Records. "Moonlight Becomes You" topped the Billboard charts for two weeks during a 17-week stay in the lists. "Constantly" and "(We're Off on the) Road to Morocco" also charted briefly. Crosby's songs were also included in the Bing's Hollywood series.

Awards and honors 
The picture received Oscar nominations for Best Sound Recording (Loren L. Ryder) and Best Writing, Original Screenplay. In 1996, Road to Morocco was selected for preservation in the United States National Film Registry by the Library of Congress as being "culturally, historically, or aesthetically significant".

The film is recognized by American Film Institute in these lists:
 1998: AFI's 100 Years...100 Movies – Nominated
 2000: AFI's 100 Years...100 Laughs – #78
 2004: AFI's 100 Years...100 Songs:
 "(We're Off on the) Road to Morocco" – #95
 "Moonlight Becomes You" – Nominated
 2007: AFI's 100 Years...100 Movies (10th Anniversary Edition) – Nominated

Legacy 
In an NPR interview, Middle East expert Dr. Jack Shaheen of Southern Illinois University cites Road to Morocco as "one of the most stereotypical films ever to come out of Hollywood." The films themselves were spoofing the popular adventure movies of the time, however.

History  
Road to Morocco featured the first affectionate interracial kiss ((between Bob Hope and Dona Drake) in film. Previously in 1934, the movie Java Head had an quick kiss between married characters Anna Mae Wong and Gerrit Ammidon.

References
Notes

External links 

Road to Morocco essay by Richard Zoglin at National Film Registry

 
 
 
 Road to Morocco essay by Daniel Eagan in America's Film Legacy: The Authoritative Guide to the Landmark Movies in the National Film Registry. A&C Black. 2010. . pp. 355-356.

1942 films
1940s adventure comedy films
1942 musical comedy films
1942 romantic comedy films
American adventure comedy films
American black-and-white films
American buddy comedy films
American musical comedy films
American comedy road movies
American romantic comedy films
American romantic musical films
1940s buddy comedy films
Road to ... (film series)
Films scored by Victor Young
Films directed by David Butler
Films set in Morocco
Paramount Pictures films
Self-reflexive films
United States National Film Registry films
1940s English-language films
1940s American films